Estadio Momoxco is a stadium in San Pedro Actopan, Milpa Alta, Mexico City, Mexico.  It is primarily used for soccer, and is the home field of the Club Cañoneros Marina. It holds 3,500 peoples.

It was opened in April 2010 and is part of a sports complex called Centro de Enseñanza de Alto Rendimiento Momoxco, which in addition to the soccer field includes a running track and a gym.

References

Sports venues in Mexico City
Football venues in Mexico